NLT (an abbreviation of Not Like Them) was an American boy band whose members were Travis Garland, Kevin McHale, Justin Joseph "JJ" Thorne, and Vahe "V" Sevani. They were discovered by Chris Stokes, who signed them to his TUG Entertainment label in 2006.

History
They were discovered by Chris Stokes, who signed them to his TUG Entertainment label in 2006. On March 13, 2007, they released their debut single, "That Girl". The following month they opened (with Chantelle Paige) for the Pussycat Dolls. The group's song "Heartburn" (produced by The Underdogs) was included on the soundtrack of the 2007 film Bratz: The Movie. NLT's second single, "She Said, I Said (Time We Let Go)", was produced by Timbaland and released on August 21, 2007. It peaked at #65 on the Billboard Pop 100. On December 18, 2007, they released a Christmas single "Silent Night". In 2008, they took part in the Johnny Wright-organized Bandemonium tour, with Menudo, and VFactory, which was less than successful. On April 15, 2008, they released their third single, "Karma", as a digital download. NLT planned to release their album Not Like Them in the summer of 2007, but the release was pushed back and ultimately cancelled. In April 2009, Travis confirmed that the group had split up.

Post-NLT 
McHale went on to appear on the TV show Glee, in the role of Artie Abrams. Thorne went on to be a part of another, now defunct boy band, One Call, with Anthony "AG" Gamlieli and two former members of Menudo, Chris Moy and Jose Bordonada, in 2018, he released an EP titled "My Laptop Was Stolen And All I Have Left Are These Songs: Mixtape". Garland premiered his debut single, the Danja-produced "Believe" on American Idol on May 19, 2010. His self-titled debut album "Travis Garland" was released on September 10, 2013. Sevani recently released his album "Steps" for free download on his website, and a new single also for free download.

Band members
Travis Garland – 1st lead vocalist, background vocals (2006-2009)
Kevin McHale – 2nd lead vocalist, background vocals (2006-2009)
Justin Joseph "JJ" Thorne – background vocals (2006-2009)
Vahe "V" Sevani – background vocals (2006-2009)

Musical style
Travis Garland and Kevin McHale are the lead vocalist and are the only members who are heard in all of their songs. Justin Thorne and V Sevani never got to sing on any songs, expect for background vocals they both contribute. Just like other pop group, NLT has choreography.

Discography 
While NLT did not record a full album, they did release a number of singles.

References

External links 
 Interscope artist page

American pop music groups
American boy bands
Musical groups established in 2003
Musical groups disestablished in 2009
Vocal quartets